Gugusse and the Automaton, also known as The Clown and the Automaton, was an 1897 French short silent film directed by Georges Méliès. The film featured a clown amazed and confused by the mechanical movements of an automaton.

The film marked the first known cinematic appearance of a robot (a word that would not replace "automaton" until its use in Karel Čapek's play R.U.R.), and was one of the earliest films to feature themes of "scientific experimentation, creation and transformation." In their Things to Come: An Illustrated History of the Science Fiction Film, Douglas Menville and R. Reginald judged Gugusse to be the most significant scientifically themed film of 1897, and suggested that "may be the first true SF film."

Gugusse was released by Méliès's Star Film Company and is numbered 111 in its catalogues. It is currently presumed lost.

References 

1897 films
Films directed by Georges Méliès
French silent short films
French science fiction films
1890s science fiction films
Robot films
Lost French films
1890s lost films
1897 short films
1890s French films
Films about clowns
Silent science fiction films
Lost science fiction films